The list of best-selling Swedish music artists according to the Swedish newspapers.

List

References

Swedish
Swedish music-related lists
Swedish music